Stealing Home: The Case of Contemporary Cuban Baseball, commonly known as Stealing Home, is a 2001 documentary about Cuban baseball defectors. The documentary was filmed in the United States, Cuba, and the Dominican Republic.

Cast 

 from PBS – Stealing Home

References

External links 

PBS – Stealing Home

2001 films
2001 documentary films
2000s sports films
Documentary films about baseball
Documentary films about Cuba
2000s English-language films